The Private History of a Campaign that Failed is one of Mark Twain's sketches (1885), a short, highly fictionalized memoir of his two-week stint in the pro-Confederate Missouri State Guard.  It takes place in Marion County, Missouri, and is about a group of inexperienced militiamen, the Marion Rangers, who end up killing a stranger in panic. (In 1887, he claimed before Union veterans that he had been in one battle in which a stranger had been killed in the summer of 1861. In fact, Twain saw no action; he quipped that during his service he spent more time retreating while being hunted than fighting.)

Television film

In 1981, a made-for-television film adaptation of The Private History of a Campaign that Failed was broadcast on PBS starring Edward Herrmann, Pat Hingle, Joseph Adams, Harry Crosby and Kelly Pease. The film also adapts Twain's short story "The War Prayer".

Cast

Edward Herrmann as The Stranger
Pat Hingle as Col. Ralls
Joseph Adams as Capt. Tom Lyman
Harry Crosby as Cpl. Ed Stevens
Kelly Pease as Cab
Gary McCleery as Second Lieutenant
Roy Cockrum as Sgt. Bowers

References

External links
 
 Full text
 mp3 audiobook 43:37
 EPUB

Short stories by Mark Twain
American Civil War memoirs
1885 short stories
Short stories adapted into films
Marion County, Missouri
Missouri State Guard
1981 television films
1981 films
1981 comedy-drama films
American television films
American comedy-drama films
Films directed by Peter H. Hunt
Works about Missouri
1980s American films